The Hasselborg Cabin, also known as the Hasselborg Creek Cabin, is a backcountry shelter in the Admiralty Island National Monument, part of Tongass National Forest in Southeast Alaska.  It is one of a number of such facilities built by Civilian Conservation Corps (CCC) on the Admiralty Island Canoe Route between 1933 and 1937.  As built by the CCC, it was a three-sided Adirondack-style log shelter, timber-framed, and measuring about 12'6" by 10'6".  It is one of only two cabins built on the route that has a fireplace; it is built of brick and stone.  It is also distinctive for its floor, which is concrete slab (apparently an original element), where most other cabins originally had dirt floors.  Its roof was originally wood shakes, but is now corrugated metal.  The front has subsequently been enclosed.

The cabin was listed on the National Register of Historic Places in 1995.

See also
National Register of Historic Places listings in Hoonah-Angoon Census Area, Alaska

References

Buildings and structures completed in 1937
Civilian Conservation Corps in Alaska
Log cabins in the United States
Buildings and structures on the National Register of Historic Places in Hoonah–Angoon Census Area, Alaska
Park buildings and structures on the National Register of Historic Places in Alaska
Tongass National Forest
Log buildings and structures on the National Register of Historic Places in Alaska